The Chartered Bank Building, also known as Bund 18, is a building along The Bund in Shanghai, China. The building houses Mr & Mrs Bund.

References

External links

 

Buildings and structures in Shanghai
The Bund